Filburn v People's Palace and Aquarium Co Ltd, 25 Q.B. Div. 258 (1890), was an English case before the Queen's Bench that imposed strict liability upon owners of wild animals for harm caused by them.

Facts 
The Plaintiff was injured by an elephant kept by the defendant in its amusement park.

Legal issue
Was the defendant responsible for the damage to the plaintiff?

Decision
The plaintiff suffered personal injuries after being attacked by an elephant owned and exhibited by the defendants.  The court ruled that a person keeps wild animals at their own peril, and that it is their responsibility to keep the animal from doing harm to others under all circumstances (a strict liability standard).

References

English tort case law
1890 in case law
1890 in British law
High Court of Justice cases